Khamis Al-Zahrani (born 3 August 1976) is a Saudi Arabian footballer who played as a midfielder for Al-Ittihad and the Saudi Arabia national team. He participated in the 1996 Asian Cup and the 1997 FIFA Confederations Cup.

Honours
Al-Ittihad
Saudi Premier League: 1996–97, 1998–99, 1999–2000, 2000–01, 2002–03
Crown Prince Cup: 1997, 2001, 2004
Saudi Federation Cup: 1997, 1999
Saudi-Egyptian Super Cup: 2001, 2003
AFC Champions League: 2004, 2005
Asian Cup Winners' Cup: 1998–99
Arab Champions League: 2004–05
Gulf Club Champions Cup: 1999

Saudi Arabia
AFC Asian Cup: 1996

References

External links

1976 births
Living people
People from Taif
Association football midfielders
Saudi Arabian footballers
Saudi Arabia international footballers
Ittihad FC players
Saudi Professional League players